Wesson is a town in Copiah and Lincoln counties, Mississippi, United States. The population was 1,925 at the 2010 census. It is part of the Jackson Metropolitan Statistical Area.

History
The town of Wesson was founded in 1864, during the Civil War, by Col. James Madison Wesson. Having lost his mills at Bankston, Wesson relocated to the town that now bears his name. There he built the Mississippi Manufacturing Company which produced a fine quality cotton fabric. In 1871 he sold the mill to William Oliver and John T. Hardy who renamed it the Mississippi Mills.

The mills became famous for the quality of cotton fabric produced which was dubbed "Mississippi silk" at the Centennial celebration of 1876. A product of the Industrial Revolution, the mills in Wesson began to utilize the new technology of the rapidly changing age. One year after Thomas Edison perfected the light bulb, the Mississippi Mills put them to use. It was said that passengers on the evening train would rush to the windows when passing through Wesson in order to see the marvelous lights.

This prosperity, however, came to an end after the death of Captain Oliver in 1891. Financial difficulties followed by the economic Panic of 1893, family conflict, and labor disputes caused the mills to fall into receivership in the early 1900s. Eventually, the mills were dismantled and sold for scrap during the First World War.

The first public school in Wesson was built in 1875, and the community college was added in 1928.

Geography
Wesson is located in southernmost Copiah County. Small portions of the town extend south and east into Lincoln County. U.S. Route 51 passes through the town, leading north  to Hazlehurst, the Copiah county seat, and south  to Brookhaven.

Demographics

2020 census

As of the 2020 United States census, there were 1,833 people, 609 households, and 429 families residing in the town.

2000 census
As of the census of 2000, there were 1,693 people, 430 households, and 319 families residing in the town. The population density was 736.0 people per square mile (284.2/km). There were 471 housing units at an average density of 204.8 per square mile (79.1/km). The racial makeup of the town was 77.73% White, 19.73% African American, 0.06% Native American, 0.24% Asian, 0.06% Pacific Islander, 1.36% from other races, and 0.83% from two or more races. Hispanic or Latino of any race were 1.83% of the population.

There were 430 households, out of which 36.7% had children under the age of 18 living with them, 56.7% were married couples living together, 14.2% had a female householder with no husband present, and 25.6% were non-families. 23.0% of all households were made up of individuals, and 8.4% had someone living alone who was 65 years of age or older. The average household size was 2.68 and the average family size was 3.14.

In the town, the population was spread out, with 19.6% under the age of 18, 36.1% from 18 to 24, 21.3% from 25 to 44, 15.4% from 45 to 64, and 7.6% who were 65 years of age or older. The median age was 21 years. For every 100 females, there were 94.6 males. For every 100 females age 18 and over, there were 94.6 males.

The median income for a household in the town was $33,021, and the median income for a family was $41,731. Males had a median income of $34,375 versus $19,732 for females. The per capita income for the town was $11,432. About 9.7% of families and 15.1% of the population were below the poverty line, including 18.7% of those under age 18 and 15.0% of those age 65 or over.

Education
Copiah-Lincoln Community College provides academic courses equivalent to the first two years of college or university work that can apply to a baccalaureate or professional degree. Co-Lin also offers programs to prepare students for employment and community service, as well as programs for workers to update their skills or learn new ones. The main campus is located in Wesson, while another campus is located in Natchez, and a facility is located in Magee.

Copiah-Lincoln Agricultural High School, through the joint efforts of Copiah and Lincoln counties, was established in the fall of 1915 at Wesson, on the edge of Copiah County. During its early years, the high school was a boarding school, serving the rural districts of those counties. However, as consolidation of local schools progressed within the counties, practically every family in each county had access to an accredited high school. This availability of local schools created a new role for the agricultural school.

Educators in the agricultural high school and in the county public schools became aware that the youth of Copiah and Lincoln counties needed educational opportunities beyond 12th grade. To meet this need, Copiah-Lincoln Community College was organized during the summer of 1928 under the authority of Section 308, Chapter 283, of the General Laws of the State of Mississippi of 1924. Although an enrollment of about 50 students was anticipated that first year, the actual enrollment was more than 90.

Since its establishment in 1928, Copiah-Lincoln has continued to grow and now occupies a prominent position in the state's educational system with an enrollment of over 2,000 and a physical plant valued at more than $35 million.

In 1934, the officials of Simpson County requested an opportunity to join in the rights and benefits of the public junior college. Accordingly, the Copiah-Lincoln Board of Trustees accepted Simpson as a cooperating county.

Since that time four additional counties have joined in the support of Copiah-Lincoln: Franklin County in 1948; Lawrence County in 1965; Jefferson County in 1967; and Adams County in 1971.

In the fall of 1978, the Copiah County superintendent of education assumed responsibility for the high school. It was renamed Wesson High School. During the fall of 1979, Wesson High School was moved to a new facility in Wesson.  Eventually it was renamed Wesson Attendance Center.

The Town of Wesson is served by the Copiah County School District.

Notable people
 Booker Brown, former professional football offensive tackle
 Lawrence R. Ellzey, U.S. Representative from Mississippi's 7th congressional district from 1932 to 1935
 Houston Stackhouse, Delta blues guitarist and singer

References

Towns in Copiah County, Mississippi
Towns in Lincoln County, Mississippi
Towns in Mississippi
Jackson metropolitan area, Mississippi